Charles Linnaeus Benedict (March 2, 1824 – January 8, 1901) was a United States district judge of the United States District Court for the Eastern District of New York.

Education and career

Born on March 2, 1824, in Newbury, Vermont, Benedict graduated from the University of Vermont in 1844 and read law in 1845. He was a grammar school principal until 1845. He entered private practice in Brooklyn, New York from 1845 to 1865. He was a member of the New York State Assembly starting in 1863.

Federal judicial service

Benedict was nominated by President Abraham Lincoln on March 6, 1865, to the United States District Court for the Eastern District of New York, to a new seat authorized by 13 Stat. 438. He was confirmed by the United States Senate on March 9, 1865, and received his commission the same day. His service terminated on January 1, 1897, due to his retirement.

Notable case

Among his many cases, Benedict signed the arrest warrant of Captain Henry W. Howgate on September 29, 1894.

Death

Benedict died on January 8, 1901, in Brooklyn.

References

Sources
 

1824 births
1901 deaths
University of Vermont alumni
Judges of the United States District Court for the Eastern District of New York
United States federal judges appointed by Abraham Lincoln
19th-century American judges
People from Newbury, Vermont
Members of the New York State Assembly
United States federal judges admitted to the practice of law by reading law